Harold G. Koenig is a psychiatrist on the faculty of Duke University.  His ideas have been covered in Newsweek and other news media with regard to religion, spirituality and health, a focus of some of his research and clinical practice. Templeton Foundation has provided great financial support to his activities.

Education and academic career
Koenig graduated with a B.S. in history from Stanford University (1974), later receiving his MD (1982) from University of California, San Francisco. He became Clinical Assistant Professor in Psychiatry (1992) and has been Professor of Psychiatry (2004-) at Duke University Medical Center.

He is currently director of Duke's Center for the Study of Religion/Spirituality and Health.

Research
Koenig has published over 280 scientific articles in peer-reviewed journals, scholarly professional journal articles and 60 chapters in professional books. In a cooperation with Raphael M. Bonelli from Sigmund Freud University Vienna he undertook the first systematic evidence based analysis on the connection between mental disorders and religion. The researchers conclude that there is good evidence that religious involvement is correlated with better mental health in the areas of depression, substance abuse, and suicide; some evidence in Stress-related disorders and dementia; insufficient evidence in bipolar disorder and schizophrenia, and no data in many other mental disorders.

Media coverage
Koenig's ideas have been covered in a wide variety of news media, ranging from BBC radio to the Vatican Radio. Examples include:

 In 2009, Newsweek featured comments from Koenig, stating that he was "leading the charge for a better understanding of patients' religious and spiritual beliefs in the medical setting. 'It just makes too much sense,' he says, when patient after patient tells him, 'Doctor, religion is the most important thing; it keeps me going.' Koenig advocates that doctors take spiritual histories of any patient they are likely to have an ongoing relationship with, asking questions like: 'Is religion a source of comfort or stress? Do you have any religious beliefs that would influence decision-making? Do you have any spiritual needs that someone should address?'"

Publications

Books
Koenig has authored or edited more than 35 books that include:
Is religion good for your health? The effects of religion on physical and mental health. Harold G. Koenig (1997, New York: Haworth Pastoral Press)
Handbook of religion and mental health. Harold G. Koenig (1998, New York: Academic Press)
Handbook of religion and health (see article). Harold G. Koenig, Michael E. McCullough, & David B. Larson. (2001, New York: Oxford University Press).
Wrote chapter 8 in the book Spirituality and Religion Within the Culture of Medicine: From Evidence to Practice Edited by Michael J. Balboni and John R. Peteet (2017, Oxford University Press).

Research articles
The main papers:

References

External links
Koenig's Duke University faculty page, accessed 12 July 2015
Koenig's CV

American psychiatrists
Living people
Duke University faculty
Stanford University alumni
University of California, San Francisco alumni
Duke University alumni
Religion and health
Year of birth missing (living people)